Lophiotoma semfala is a species of sea snail, a marine gastropod mollusk in the family Turridae, the turrids.

Description
The length of the shell attains 35.7 mm. The shell is a pale yellow in color with brown dots lining the shell. The shape of the shell is very slender especially at the bottom where the animal is

Distribution
This marine species occurs off Vanuatu and Papua New Guinea.

References

External links

 Puillandre N., Fedosov A.E., Zaharias P., Aznar-Cormano L. & Kantor Y.I. (2017). A quest for the lost types of Lophiotoma (Gastropoda: Conoidea: Turridae): integrative taxonomy in a nomenclatural mess. Zoological Journal of the Linnean Society. 181: 243-271

semfala
Gastropods described in 2017